Frederick Henry "Ted" Ohlson (15 October 1886 – 28 October 1952) was an Australian rules footballer who played for the Richmond Football Club in the VFL from 1908 to 1915.

Family
The son of Philip Henry Ohlson (1863-1935), and Mary Jane Ohlson (1869-1954), née Wilson, Frederick Henry Ohlson was born at Collingwood, Victoria on 15 October 1886.

He married Mary Ellen McGuire (1885-1936) on 10 July 1920.

Football

Richmond (VFL)

Death
He died at his sister's house in North Coburg on 28 October 1952.

Footnotes

References
 Hogan P: The Tigers Of Old, Richmond FC, (Melbourne), 1996. 
 Promising Bowler, The Herald, (Friday, 31 January 1913), p.3.

External links

 
 
 Ted Ohlson, at Boyles Football Photos.

1886 births
Richmond Football Club players
Australian rules footballers from Melbourne
1952 deaths
People from Collingwood, Victoria